The Royal Western Australia Regiment is a reserve infantry regiment of the Australian Army consisting of two battalions, the 11th/28th Battalion and the 16th Battalion. The regiment was raised in July 1960 as part of the reorganisation of the Australian Army Reserve through the amalgamation of the three existing infantry regiments in Western Australia:
 The City of Perth Regiment
 The Cameron Highlanders of Western Australia
 The Swan Regiment

Initially formed as a single battalion, in 1966 it was reorganised into first two, then three battalions. Two of these, the 11th Battalion and 28th Battalion were reduced to single companies in 1977, then amalgamated into the single 11th/28th Battalion in 1987.

The regiment perpetuates the traditions of three battalions of the Australian Imperial Force:
 11th Battalion – the 11th Battalion was raised in 1903 when the Perth Rifle Volunteers was renamed as the 11th Australian Infantry Regiment. On the outbreak of the First World War, volunteers from the 11th Regiment were recruited into the 11th Battalion of the Australian Imperial Force. This unit saw action in the Middle East at Gallipoli and in France before the end of the war. For its service, the battalion was awarded a King's Colour. The battalion was amalgamated with the 16th Battalion for a time, named as the 11th/16th Battalion for three years, before regaining its former title for service during the Second World War. A second battalion, 2/11th Battalion, was raised for service overseas in 1939. This saw service in North Africa, Greece and Crete, where the majority of its men were captured following the Battle of Retimo Airfield. Reformed in Syria in 1941, the 2/11th Battalion moved to New Guinea in 1943. Both war raised battalions were disbanded in 1946.
 16th Battalion – the 16th Battalion was originally raised in September 1914. It was landed at Gallipoli the following year, also seeing service in France. The battalion was disbanded at the end of the war, then becoming a Citizen Military Force unit. It amalgamated with the 11th Battalion in 1930. A new 16th Battalion was raised in 1936 as the Cameron Highlanders of Western Australia. This battalion saw service in Syria, New Guinea and Borneo before the end of the Second World War.
 28th Battalion – the 28th Battalion was raised in 1915, and saw service in the Middle East and Western Front before being disbanded in 1919. The battalion was reformed from its militia unit for the Second World War, serving alongside the 11th Battalion in New Britain. The 2/28th Battalion saw service overseas in North Africa, the Middle East and New Guinea. It was disbanded in 1946.

Battle honours

11th/28th Battalion
 South Africa 1899–1902
 The Great War: Pozieres, Messines, Passchendaele, Mont St.Quentin, Landing at Anzac, Somme 1916–1918, Bullecourt, Ypres 1917, Amiens, Hindenburg Line
 World War II: Capture of Tobruk, Defence of Tobruk, El Alamein, Brallos Pass, Liberation of New Guinea, Kokoda Trail, Borneo, Damour, Lae-Nadzab, Labuan

16th Battalion
 South Africa 1899–1902
 World War I: Somme 1916–1918, Pozieres, Bullecourt, Messines 1917, Ypres 1917, Polygon Wood, Passchandaele, Arras 1918, Hamel, Amiens, Albert 1918, Hindenburg Line, Epehy, France and Flanders 1916–1918, Anzac, Landing at Anzac, Defence of Anzac, Suvla, Sari Bair, Gallipoli 1915, Egypt 1915–1916
 World War II: North Africa 1941, Syria, Syrian Frontier, The Litani, Sidon, Wadi Zeini, Damour, South West Pacific 1942 – 1945, Kokoda Trail, Isurava, Eora Creek, Templetons Crossing, Efogi-Menari, Ioribaiwa, Buna-Gona, Gona, Liberation of Australian New Guinea, Ramu Valley, Shaggy Ridge, Borneo, Balikpapan, Waitavolo

Alliances
  – The Highlanders
  – The Princess of Wales's Royal Regiment (Queen's and Royal Hampshires)
  – The Rifles

See also
 Australian Army
 Australian Army Reserve
 List of Australian Army Regiments

External links
 Official website of the Royal Western Australia Regiment

WA
Military units and formations established in 1960
Australian army units with royal patronage
1960 establishments in Australia
Military Units in Western Australia